James "Jim" Walls (born November 30, 1940) is an American video game designer and former police officer. He is notable for having designed the successful Police Quest series of adventure games for Sierra On-Line.

Walls served as a California Highway Patrol (CHP) officer from 1971 to 1986, but retired after being involved in a shooting. He met Sierra president Ken Williams, who wished to create an adventure game in the police procedural genre. Walls, though inexperienced with computers, offered his policing experience. During his career at Sierra, Walls designed the first three Police Quest entries and Codename: ICEMAN.

After leaving Sierra in the early 1990s, Walls joined several other game developers, including Tsunami Media in 1992 and Westwood Studios in 1996, before retiring in 2003. In 2013, Walls planned to develop Precinct, a spiritual successor to Police Quest, but the crowdfunding campaign failed.

Early life
Walls was born on November 30, 1940 in Kingsburg, California. For much of his life, he lived in Kingsburg, Richmond, Berkeley, El Cerrito, and Coarsegold, with frequent visits to family in Fresno and Oakhurst. Walls began his career as an optician in Fresno, working for various optometrists and ophthalmologists.

Around 1969, Walls met the husband of a co-worker, who was one week shy of graduating the CHP Academy. While speaking with him, Walls was overcome with the man's enthusiasm for his new career and sought a career for himself in law enforcement, joining the CHP Academy and graduating in December 1971.

Police career
Walls joined the California Highway Patrol in 1971, assigned to the Van Nuys neighborhood of Los Angeles, though he had numerous other assignments across the state.

In January 1984, while conducting a traffic stop, Walls was involved in a shootout with a parolee. Though he survived the incident, Walls began to experience trauma relating to the shootout, and in 1985, Walls was placed on "4800 time" (the CHP's term for administrative leave) to evaluate his condition.

Walls officially retired from the CHP in 1986, after 15 years of service.

Video game career

Sierra On-Line
While still on administrative leave in 1985, Walls' then-wife Donna, who was a hairdresser in Oakhurst, introduced him to Ken Williams, co-founder and then-president of Sierra On-Line. Williams would frequently visit Donna's salon for a haircut, and he would converse with Donna and Walls. During one such conversation, Williams discussed how he wanted to produce a police procedural adventure game, particularly one with a genuine police officer involved in its development to ensure realism and authenticity. At the time, Sierra had produced numerous adventure games across a variety of genres—such as the King's Quest fantasy series, the Space Quest science fiction series, and the Leisure Suit Larry sex comedy series—but not many games following police or particularly modern settings. After the conversation, he gave Donna his business card and asked Walls to call him.

In 1987, after retiring from the CHP, Williams invited Walls over for racquetball, which Walls was inexperienced in. After a few matches, they went for drinks, where they discussed Williams' idea of a police adventure game. Williams asked Walls to condense his experiences in the CHP into a short story, preferably around two pages long. Walls wrote the story and showed it to Williams several days later; Williams was impressed, and asked Walls to detail it into four or five pages. This process continued until Walls' short story developed into the plot of the first Police Quest game, at which point the story was converted into a design document and broken into game components for development.

At the time, Walls was unfamiliar with computers, and was unsure if video game design was a viable career. Describing his experience writing the initial story concept, Walls reminisced: "When I first sat down in front of a computer to begin the design story of the original Police Quest, I had to be shown where the on/off switch was. I typed the entire story with two fingers (after all, the only skills I had at the time were chasing people down and throwing them in jail)." However, he soon overcame his concerns, and his computer skills developed with help from fellow Sierra designers Ken Williams, Roberta Williams, Mark Crowe, Scott Murphy, and Al Lowe. Many aspects of Police Quest were based on aspects of Walls' life: the series protagonist, Sonny Bonds, was loosely based on Walls' son (also named Sonny), and many incidents encountered in the game (and the next two Police Quest installments) were inspired by actual incidents encountered by Walls over the course of his CHP career.

In 1987, Police Quest: In Pursuit of the Death Angel was released. The game placed heavy focus on realism and proper police procedure to succeed. Walls considered fan mail sent in by players, ranging from active police officers to children that wanted to become police officers because of the game, as the "ultimate reward". Walls' career in Sierra continued with the development of Police Quest II: The Vengeance in 1988, Codename: ICEMAN in 1989, and Police Quest III: The Kindred in 1991. Walls also made self-insert cameos in the Police Quest games; he appears in name only in each game's police database as an officer or criminal, his mugshot appears in the intro cutscene of Police Quest II, and he physically appears in Police Quest III's intro and game over sequences.

After the release of Police Quest III, circumstances developed that led to his resignation from Sierra. Following Walls' resignation, the Police Quest series continued, but under the direction of former Los Angeles Police Department chief Daryl F. Gates, who changed the setting of the series from the fictional city of Lytton, California to his more familiar setting of Los Angeles.

Post-Sierra
In 1992, Walls joined Tsunami Media, which largely consisted of former Sierra employees and was also housed in Oakhurst. Walls' time with Tsunami Media was brief, and he only worked on one game for Tsunami, 1993's Blue Force, a spiritual successor to the original Police Quest trilogy. After leaving Tsunami Media, Walls contracted with two other companies—Tachyon Studios and Philips Interactive Media—for games that would ultimately never see release.

In 1996, Walls was contracted by Las Vegas-based Westwood Studios to work on 1997's Blade Runner. He was subsequently offered a full-time design position, working on Pirates: The Legend of Black Kat and Earth & Beyond, both released in 2002. In 2003, Westwood Studios was bought out by Electronic Arts and merged into EA Los Angeles, with most employees, including Walls, let go as part of the company's acquisition.

Precinct 
On February 2, 2013, during a podcast hosted by Chris Pope, Walls announced he had plans to develop a successor to Police Quest, using Kickstarter for funding. On July 16, 2013, the new game proposal was finally announced as Precinct, a 3D adventure game serving as a modern spiritual successor to Police Quest. The game, following police officer Maxwell Jones in the city of Fraser Canyon, California, would be developed by Jim Walls Reloaded, led by Walls and Sierra developer Robert Lindsley. A fundraising campaign was held from July 16 to August 16 with a maximum goal of $500,000, but it was unsuccessful, and Walls prematurely canceled the campaign on August 6. An alternate fundraising campaign was held without the time restriction, but it was also unsuccessful and was shut down due to a lack of momentum. Ultimately, the fundraising campaign did not surpass $7,000. Nevertheless, Walls and Lindsley still remain hopeful to realize Precinct sometime in the future.

Personal life 
Walls was married to Donna Walls, though the timespan of their marriage is unknown. By September 2008, Walls was married to Kristy Walls.

As of 2014, Walls is retired, though he remains hopeful that a video game developer will approach him to develop Precinct.

Games

References

External links
 
 Jim Walls at MobyGames
 

Living people
American video game designers
American state police officers
California Highway Patrol
Police Quest and SWAT
Sierra On-Line employees
Year of birth missing (living people)